Drew MacIntyre (born June 24, 1983) is a Canadian former professional ice hockey goaltender. , he is a developmental goaltending coach and scout for the Manitoba Moose in the American Hockey League.

Playing career
MacIntyre played his entire junior hockey career in the Quebec Major Junior Hockey League with the Sherbrooke Beavers. Playing four seasons with Sherbrooke, from 1999–2000 to 2002–03, he recorded seven shutouts in 188 regular season games.

Following his second junior hockey season, MacIntyre was chosen in round four of the 2001 NHL Entry Draft by the Detroit Red Wings, 121st overall. He turned pro in 2002–03 with the Toledo Storm of the ECHL. He remained within the Red Wings' organization for four seasons, including several American Hockey League (AHL) call-ups to the Grand Rapids Griffins.

In the 2006 off-season, MacIntyre signed with the Vancouver Canucks and subsequently spent the 2006–07 season with the team's AHL affiliate, the Manitoba Moose. MacIntyre set Moose regular-season franchise records with a 2.17 goals against average (surpassed by Cory Schneider in 2008–09) and a .922 save percentage (tied with Johan Hedberg, 1997–98), while posting a 24–12–2 record.

During the 2007–08 season, MacIntyre was called up by the Canucks on December 11, 2007, due to a minor injury to starting goaltender Roberto Luongo. Two days later, on December 13, MacIntyre made his NHL debut mid-way through the second period in relief of Canucks starter Curtis Sanford in a game against the San Jose Sharks. On January 29, 2008, MacIntyre made his second NHL appearance in relief of Sanford once more. He allowed one goal on 11 shots and picked up the loss in the Canucks' 4–3 defeat to the Stars. The two appearances marked his only NHL action during his tenure with the Canucks, recording a 2.95 goals against average and .864 save percentage.

After being sent back to the Moose, MacIntyre became the ninth AHL goaltender to score a goal with an overtime game-winner. During a game against the Chicago Wolves on February 20, 2008, the Wolves had pulled their goaltender on a delayed penalty in overtime when an errant pass from Wolves forward Steve Martins travelled the length of the rink into the Wolves' net. MacIntyre, being the last Moose player to touch the puck on a save, was credited with the goal. On February 27, MacIntyre was named the AHL Player of the Week, having stopped 98 out of 101 shots over three road starts with a 0.98 goals against average and his game-winner. MacIntyre completed his second season with the Moose with a 2.32 goals against average, .921 save percentage and 25-18-2 record, while sharing starts with Canucks' first-rounder Cory Schneider.

Becoming an unrestricted free agent in the 2008 off-season, MacIntyre agreed to terms with the Nashville Predators on a one-year deal on July 1, 2008. He played the entire year for the Milwaukee Admirals of the AHL, appearing in 55 games with an AHL career-high 34 wins.

The following off-season, MacIntyre signed with the Atlanta Thrashers on July 4, 2009. He was subsequently assigned to the team's AHL affiliate, the Chicago Wolves.

On February 28, 2011, MacIntyre was traded from the Atlanta Thrashers to the Montreal Canadiens in exchange for Brett Festerling.

MacIntyre signed a one-year contract with the Buffalo Sabres on July 7, 2011.

On February 13, 2013, MacIntyre was signed to a professional tryout contract with the Toronto Marlies of the American Hockey League. On April 2, 2013, Drew MacIntyre signed an NHL contract with the Toronto Maple Leafs for the remainder of the 2012–13 season.

On June 13, 2013, the Maple Leafs re-signed MacIntyre to a one-year, two-way contract. In the back end of the 2013–14 season on April 10, 2014, MacInytre started his first NHL game against the Florida Panthers.

MacInytre continued his journeyman path in signing as a free agent to a one-year two way contract with the Carolina Hurricanes on July 1, 2014. In the 2014–15 season, he assumed the starting goaltender role with AHL affiliate, the Charlotte Checkers. In 51 games he collected 20 wins as the Checkers missed the post-season.  On May 29, 2015, MacIntyre opted to remain within the Hurricanes organization, signing a one-year two-way contract extension.

In the following 2015–16 season, with the emergence of Hurricanes' goaltender prospects, MacIntyre was dealt at the trade deadline to the Chicago Blackhawks in exchange for Dennis Robertson on February 29, 2016. MacIntyre was directly assigned to the AHL to help solidify the Rockford IceHogs. In December 2015, he represented Team Canada at the Spengler Cup and helped capture the title.

On April 27, 2016, MacIntyre opted to halt his North American career and put pen to paper to embark on a career abroad with a two-year deal with the Hamburg Freezers of the German top-flight Deutsche Eishockey Liga. However, shortly thereafter the Hamburg Freezers announced they had entered administration and ceased operations, returning MacIntyre to free agency. On September 7, 2016, having returned to North America, MacIntyre signed a professional try-out contract to attend the training camp of the Washington Capitals. After being released, he inked a deal with Medvescak Zagreb of the Kontinental Hockey League in October 2016. He played in 21 games for Zagreb with a 2.66 goals against average and a .925 save percentage. On January 8, 2017, he put pen to paper on a deal for the remainder of the season with Adler Mannheim of the Deutsche Eishockey Liga.

After starting the 2017–18 season with Medvescak Zagreb, he moved back to Germany in October 2017, signing with Deutsche Eishockey Liga outfit Straubing Tigers.

He officially retired from playing on April 1, 2021.

Career statistics

Regular season and playoffs

References

External links
 

1983 births
Living people
Buffalo Sabres players
Canadian ice hockey goaltenders
Canadian people of Scottish descent
Charlotte Checkers (2010–) players
Chicago Wolves players
Detroit Red Wings draft picks
Grand Rapids Griffins players
Hamilton Bulldogs (AHL) players
Ice hockey people from Prince Edward Island
HC Lev Praha players
Manitoba Moose players
Milwaukee Admirals players
Nippon Paper Cranes players
Oji Eagles players
Ontario Junior Hockey League players
Reading Royals players
Rochester Americans players
Rockford IceHogs (AHL) players
Sherbrooke Castors players
Sportspeople from Charlottetown
Straubing Tigers players
Toledo Storm players
Toronto Maple Leafs players
Toronto Marlies players
Vancouver Canucks players
KHL Medveščak Zagreb players
Canadian expatriate ice hockey players in the Czech Republic
Canadian expatriate ice hockey players in Croatia
Canadian expatriate ice hockey players in Germany
Canadian expatriate ice hockey players in the United States
Canadian expatriate ice hockey players in Slovakia
Canadian expatriate ice hockey players in Japan